Jamie Smith (born 25 June 1988) is a retired rugby union player from Ballymena, Northern Ireland, who progressed through the Ulster Academy. His usual position was Full back.

Rugby career
Smith was voted Ulster Young Player of the Year in 2009. In September 2011 he joined Newport Gwent Dragons. He was released by Newport Gwent Dragons at the end of the 2012–13 season due to a career ending injury.

Coaching career
Jamie moved to Barbados in August 2017 to coach the Barbados national team 'The Barjans'.

Personal life
Smith resides in Barbados with his wife Narissa.

References

External links 
 Jamie Smith Newport Gwent Dragons (Archived)

Irish rugby union players
Dragons RFC players
Living people
1988 births
Rugby union players from Ballymena
Rugby union fullbacks
Ulster Rugby players